Jessica Holmes (born August 29, 1973) is a Canadian comedian and actress. She is best known for her work with the Royal Canadian Air Farce, which she joined in 2003, after starring in her own show, The Holmes Show in 2002.  She is married to actor Scott Yaphe.

Holmes attended Canterbury High School in Ottawa followed by Ryerson University in Toronto.

For one season, Holmes hosted her own show, The Holmes Show.  She also appeared on XPM and History Bites.

Holmes is the daughter of a feminist mother and a Mormon father. She joined the Church of Jesus Christ of Latter-day Saints (LDS Church) at age 19; beginning at age 21, for 18 months she was a Mormon missionary in Venezuela. She is no longer a member of the LDS Church. In her comedy, she parodies right wing Christian fundamentalists through her character, Candy Anderson Henderson. She also parodies this by appearing as Sister Bessy, a nun with a thick Scottish accent who comments on politics.

On both The Holmes Show and Air Farce, she has performed caricatures of various celebrities, including Michael Jackson, Celine Dion, Liza Minnelli, Myriam Bédard, Belinda Stronach, Geri Halliwell, Britney Spears, Tim Allen, Jim Carrey and others.

Jessica and Scott have 2 children. Penelope Corrin was her fill-in on Air Farce during Jessica's first maternity leave during the first two months of 2007. She returned to the show in March 2007. Holmes took her second leave during the first few episodes of Air Farce'''s last season in October 2008, as she gave birth to her second child.Air Farce left the air as a regular show as of December 2008.   Though the show has broadcast an annual reunion special every year since, Holmes has only participated in the 2010 and 2016 reunion special.

In 2010, she published a memoir entitled I Love Your Laugh: Finding the Light in My Screwball Life.

Holmes has appeared in a number of Ross Petty's annual Christmas pantomime family musicals at the Toronto's Elgin Theatre.

She received a Canadian Screen Award nomination for Best Lead Performance in a Web Program or Series at the 10th Canadian Screen Awards in 2022, for her role in The Communist's Daughter''.

Filmography

Television

References

External links

1973 births
Actresses from Ottawa
Canadian film actresses
Canadian television personalities
Canadian television actresses
Canadian voice actresses
Canadian Unitarian Universalists
Former Latter Day Saints
Living people
Mormon missionaries in Venezuela
Royal Canadian Air Farce
Toronto Metropolitan University alumni
Canadian Mormon missionaries
20th-century Mormon missionaries
Female Mormon missionaries
Canadian women comedians
Canadian expatriates in Venezuela
Converts to Mormonism
Canadian memoirists
Canadian sketch comedians
Canadian women television personalities
Canadian impressionists (entertainers)
Canadian women memoirists
21st-century Canadian comedians
Comedians from Ontario